Systemic vulnerability is a concept in political economy of development which refers to conditions that tend to make a state more effective in promoting development. These conditions have been described as "broad [governing] coalitions", "resource constraints", and "external threat".

References

Political economy